Karnes City Independent School District is a public school district based in Karnes City, Texas (USA).

Located in Karnes County, a small portion of the district extends into Atascosa County.

In 2009, the school district was rated "recognized" by the Texas Education Agency.

Schools
Karnes City High (Grades 9–12)
Karnes City Junior High (Grades 6–8)
Roger E. Sides Elementary (Grades PK-5)

References

External links
 

School districts in Karnes County, Texas
School districts in Atascosa County, Texas